ITCH is a HECT domain E3 ubiquitin ligase that is ablated in non-agouti-lethal 18H (aka Itchy) mice. Itchy mice develop a severe immunological phenotype after birth that includes hyperplasia of lymphoid and hematopoietic cells, and stomach and lung inflammation. In humans ITCH deficiency causes altered physical growth, craniofacial morphology defects, defective muscle development, and aberrant immune system function. ITCH contains a C2 domain, proline-rich region, WW domains, HECT domain, and multiple amino acids that are phosphorylated and ubiquitinated.

Regulation by phosphorylation 
ITCH is regulated by MAPK8. MAPK8 regulates JUNB protein turnover by MAPK8-dependent phosphorylation of ITCH and a subsequent conformational change in ITCH. This mechanism is discrete from the direct activation of Jun family transcription factors by direct phosphorylation. ITCH serves as a paradigm for our understanding of the regulation of the ubiquitylation machinery by direct protein phosphorylation of its components. Importantly, this regulatory process controls the balance of Th2 cytokine secretion by negatively regulating JUNB levels and Interleukin 4 transcription.

Interaction partners 
Itch has been shown to interact with a number of proteins, including:
 CXCR4, 
 c-Jun,
 MAP2K4,
 MAP3K1,
 MAP3K7,
 MAPK8,
 N4BP1,
 NOTCH1,
 TP63, and
 TP73.

References

External links